is a private junior college in Akita, Akita, Japan.

History 
The junior college opened in April 1996 with two academic departments: nursing and care work, but the predecessor of the school was founded in 1896.

Courses offered 
 Certified care work
 Nursing

See also 
 Japanese Red Cross Akita College of Nursing
 List of junior colleges in Japan

References

External links 
  

Educational institutions established in 1996
Japanese junior colleges
1996 establishments in Japan
Universities and colleges in Akita Prefecture
Private universities and colleges in Japan